In ancient Rome orators could become like celebrities, many were wealthy and well-respected. Public speaking became a popular form of entertainment and was central to Roman politics.

List
This list is in alphabetical order

See also 
 List of speeches
 List of Latin phrases (full)
 Orator

Notes

References

External links 
 Roman Sources - Speeches, Political and Rhetorical Works on Librarium - Database of Online Ancient Sources

Roman
speeches